Soe Lwin Lwin (18 September 1962 – 25 July 1999), also known as Po Po, was a well-known singer-composer in the 1980s in Myanmar. He penned several songs for successful singers such as Kaiser, Hlwan Moe and Maung Galon. "Chit Lu-Maik", "A-May", "Maung Myet Yay Waing" and "Ko-Gyin Sa-Na Ge Ya Bi Lay" were some of his successful songs.

He died in Yangon on 25 July 1999.

Album discography 
Some of solo albums were as follows:

 Chit Lu-Maik
 Thuyegaung Doh-Ye Hnalontha
 Kyuntaw Ma Thi De Kyuntaw (1988)

01.စိုးလွင်လွင်(မင်းထက်သာတဲ့လူ) circa 1980
  Success, lynn Studio
  တေးရေး Kaizar,WinNaing,AungKhaingMaw,SoeLwinLwin
02.စိုးလွင်လွင်(ချစ်လူမိုက်)
  Success,ရဲခေါင်(မေ)
  တေးရေး နိုင်မြန်မာ၊စိုးလွင်လွင်၊ဖိုးရှမ်း၊AungKhaingMaw
03.စိုးလွင်လွင်(သူရဲကောင်းတို့ရဲ့နှလုံးသား)
  Success,
04.စိုးလွင်လွင်(ကျွန်တော်မသိတဲ့ကျွန်တော်)
  Success,
05.စိုးလွင်လွင်(မာနမျက်နှာ)
  Success,
06.စိုးလွင်လွင်(မောင့်မျက်ရည်ဝိုင်း)
  Success,
 တေးရေး Kaizar,NyiNyiSan,NyiNyiThwin,YarPyae,SoeLwinLwin 
07.စိုးလွင်လွင်(မြင်းရိုင်းတစ်ကောင်)
  
08.စိုးလွင်လွင်(ကျွန်တော်တစ်ယောက်တည်းလမ်းပေါ်မှာ)
09.စိုးလွင်လွင်(ချစ်တဲ့ငြမ်း)

References

1962 births
1999 deaths
20th-century Burmese male singers
Burmese singer-songwriters